Freya, or Freyja, is a goddess in Norse mythology.

Freya may refer to:

Freya (cat), owned by George Osborne, British Chancellor of the Exchequer
Freya (character), a Marvel Comics character
Freya (plant), a genus in the daisy family
Freya (spider), a genus of jumping spiders
Freya (walrus), walrus euthanised in 2022
Freya Crescent, a character in the video game Final Fantasy IX
Mount Freya, Victoria Land, Antarctica
, a German Imperial Navy protected cruiser
 UC1 Freya, a private Danish submarine
 Freya, former name of the schooner American SpiritFreya (band), an American metal/hardcore band
"Freya" (song), a song by The Sword from the 2006 album Age of Winters''
Freya (singer), Danish singer
Freya (given name), a feminine given name derived from the name of the goddess
Jo Freya, British singer
Freya radar, a German World War II radar
Freya, third stable version of elementary OS, a Linux distribution
Freya, a brand of large-bust and full-figure lingerie manufactured by Wacoal
Freya, a character in the anime television series Saint Seiya
Freya, a character in the manga series Chobits

See also 

 Freia (disambiguation)
 Freja (disambiguation)
 Freyja (disambiguation)